A memistor is a nanoelectric circuitry element used in parallel computing memory technology. Essentially, a resistor with memory able to perform logic operations and store information, it is a three-terminal implementation of the memristor.

History
While the memristor is defined in terms of a two-terminal circuit element, there was an implementation of a three-terminal device called a memistor developed by Bernard Widrow in 1960. Memistors formed basic components of a neural network architecture called ADALINE developed by Widrow. The memistor was also used in MADALINE.

Essence
In one of the technical reports the memistor was described as follows:

Since the conductance was described as being controlled by the time integral of current as in Chua's theory of the memristor, the memistor of Widrow may be considered as a form of memristor having three instead of two terminals. However, one of the main limitations of Widrow's memistors was that they were made from an electroplating cell rather than as a solid-state circuit element. Solid-state circuit elements were required to achieve the scalability of the integrated circuit which was gaining popularity around the same time as the invention of Widrow's memistor.

An article on ArXiv suggests that the floating-gate MOSFET as well as other 3-terminal "memory transistors" may be modeled using dynamical systems equations in a similar fashion to the memristive systems of memristors.

See also
Memristor
Trancitor

References

External links

 Memistor - Research at Cisco

Electrical components
Electronic circuits in computer storage